Aiyai: Wrathful Soul is a 2020 Australian psychological, supernatural, mystery thriller directed by Ilanthirayan Alan Arumugam in his directorial debut while the script was made alongside Mukund Ramanad and Charles Benedict. The film was produced by Kanesh Mohana Sundaram of Aiyai Pty Ltd. The film premiered on 28 February 2020.

Premise 
Kiran, an Indian student living in Australia, becomes a medium to exist for a vengeful spirit of a homeless woman. Kiran gets visions of many things he cannot understand, and the spirit inside him uses Kiran to fulfill its vengeance.

Cast

Production 
Kabir Singh plays the role of the protagonist, Damien Beebe handles cinematography, and production design is by Tim Hodgman. Editing and sound design is by Roberto Merlini and the music is composed by Jason Fernandez. The film was entirely filmed in Australia.

References

External links 
 

2020 directorial debut films
2020 films
Australian thriller films
2020 psychological thriller films
2020s English-language films